ABU Garcia, originally AB Urfabriken (Swedish: "Watch Factory Ltd."), then ABU Svängsta, is a fishing reel and equipment manufacturing company founded in Svängsta, Sweden, and is now owned by Pure Fishing conglomerate of the United States.

Early history

AB Urfabriken began at a factory located near the Mörrum River in Svängsta, Blekinge, Sweden. The company, founded in 1921, originally manufactured watches, telephone timers and taximeters. However, the founder's son, Göte Borgström, a fishing enthusiast, soon redirected its focus towards fishing reels during World War II, when demand for those traditional products diminished. 

The leading American outdoor sports participant distributing and manufacturing firm Garcia Corporation (1947-1978) was the largest fishing tackle company of its time, formerly known under the earlier name Charles Garcia & Company, New York City. The Garcia Corporation started importing and marketing ABU Svängsta's many reels in the 1950s, including the famous "Ambassadeur" reels. 

Garcia Co. was already involved in the importing, marketing and distributing of the Mitchell 300 spinning reel from France since 1947. The Garcia Tackle Company of 1979-1980 was a short-lived partnership between ABU Svängsta and Mitchell S.A. of France, and in 1980, ABU Svängsta acquired the New Jersey-based Garcia Tackle Company, and changed their name to ABU Garcia.  Mitchell S.A. would go their own way, but the two brands would join together again under the Pure Fishing banner, only again to be sold to the Jarden Corporation in April 2007. In December 2015, Newell Rubbermaid acquired Jarden Corporation, and in November 2018 sold Pure Fishing to Sycamore Partners.

Modern developments

ABU Garcia introduced a series of fishing reels and related products in the beginning of the 1950s. The Swedish built ABU 444, the company's first spinning reel, was introduced in 1955, followed in 1965 by the first model of the Cardinal series of spinning reels.

Beginning in 1957, the company also became known for its advanced spin cast reels (Abumatic) featuring several engineering innovations such as level wind mechanisms (oscillating spools), under rod spin cast reel designs (the Abu 500 series) and improved drags for fighting larger gamefish. 

The famous Ambassadeur series of bait casting reels, which utilized advanced metal alloys, ball bearing friction interfaces, and precisely cut gears, was introduced at the New York World's Fair in 1954, and subsequent Ambassadeur models are still produced by the company. The professional angler Paul Gustafson worked for seven years as chief angling consultant for ABU Garcia.

Today, they still continue the Ambassadeur line, along with a branched off line of low profile cast reels, the Ambassadeur Revo.

Collections
There are collectors of ABU Equipment.

ABU Garcia Collectors from all around the world choose to buy, sell and exchange rare items on popular auction sites such as eBay.com and Tradera.com (Swedish). Rare items can fetch thousands of dollars. Specialist sites exist to aid finding these items such as Auction Angler. Publications that aid the collector of merchandise of ABU Garcia include The Ambassadeur and I and its sequel The Ambassadeur and I Final Chapter both by Simon Shimomura. 

There is also a book titled Vintage Fishing Reels of Sweden by Daniel Skupien, that contains a large amount of valuable information on ABU Garcia fishing tackle, as well as a comprehensive work detailing the history of smaller Ambassadeur reels,´Small Ambassadeurs: The Legendary Light-line Fishing Reels: The Ambassadeur 2500C, 1500C and related Models by authors Espen Sjaastad and Karl-Eric Svensson.

See also
 Comparison of hub gears
 Fishing reel

References

Manufacturing companies of Sweden
Purveyors to the Court of Sweden
Manufacturing companies established in 1921
Fishing equipment manufacturers
1921 establishments in Sweden
2007 mergers and acquisitions
2016 mergers and acquisitions
2018 mergers and acquisitions
Companies based in Blekinge County